Oxidative coupling in chemistry is a coupling reaction of two molecular entities through an oxidative process.  Usually oxidative couplings are catalysed by a transition metal complex like in classical cross-coupling reactions, although the underlying mechanism is different due to the oxidation process that requires an external (or internal) oxidant.  Many such couplings utilize dioxygen as the stoichiometric oxidant but proceed by electron transfer.

C-C Couplings
Many oxidative couplings generate new C-C bonds.  Early examples involve coupling of terminal alkynes:
2 RC≡CH  +  2 Cu(I)  →   RC≡C-C≡CR  +  2 Cu  +  2 H+

Coupling of methane
Coupling reactions involving methane are highly sought, related to C1 chemistry because C2 derivatives are far more valuable than methane. The oxidative coupling of methane gives ethylene:
 2 +  →  + 2

Aromatic coupling

In oxidative aromatic coupling the reactants are electron-rich aromatic compounds.  Typical substrates are phenols and typical catalysts are copper and iron compounds and enzymes. The first reported synthetic application dates back to 1868 with Julius Löwe and the synthesis of ellagic acid by heating gallic acid with arsenic acid or silver oxide. Another reaction is the synthesis of 1,1'-Bi-2-naphthol from 2-naphthol by iron chloride, discovered in 1873 by Alexander Dianin  (S)-BINOL can be prepared directly from an asymmetric oxidative coupling of 2-naphthol with copper(II) chloride.

Other oxidative couplings
The oxygen evolution reaction entails, in effect, the oxidative coupling of water molecules to give O2.

References

Chemical reactions